Hersey is an MBTA Commuter Rail station in Needham, Massachusetts. Located in the Bird's Hill neighborhood, it serves the Needham Line. The station serves as a park-and-ride, with easy access from Route 128. Hersey station has been open since 1917, except for an 8-year closure during Southwest Corridor construction. It is fully accessible.

History

The Needham cutoff opened on November 4, 1906, from West Roxbury to Needham Junction, allowing trains from the former New York and New England Railroad to reach Boston without needing to use the New York Central's Highland branch. Needham Junction was originally the only stop on the cutoff; Bird's Hill opened as an infill station at Great Plains Avenue in 1917.

The station was closed with the rest of the line on October 13, 1979, due to Southwest Corridor construction.
On March 21, 1980, the Massachusetts Legislature directed the MBTA to rename the station to honor Needham selectman Henry D. Hersey, "an outstanding spokesman for commuter rail service in the commonwealth".  In addition to this station, the MBTA also honored Hersey by naming locomotive MBTA 1000 as Henry D. Hersey "Mr. Commuter Rail". Newly designated Hersey station reopened with the rest of the line on October 19, 1987.

Unlike the other Needham Line stations, Hersey was not renovated during the closure with a mini-high platform for handicapped accessibility. A mini-high platform was added between 1990 and 1992, making the Needham Line the first completely accessible line on the MBTA system; a parking lot was also added on the south side of the station

References

External links

MBTA - Hersey
 Great Plain Avenue entrance from Google Maps Street View

Buildings and structures in Needham, Massachusetts
Former New York, New Haven and Hartford Railroad stations
MBTA Commuter Rail stations in Norfolk County, Massachusetts
Railway stations in the United States opened in 1917
1917 establishments in Massachusetts